Mahnoor is a Pakistani musical film directed by  Adnan Wai Qureshi, written by Zafar Mairaj and produced by Kamran Qureshi and Nadeem J.

It's a story of a young girl, who was brought up in prostitution business area of town and was taught to dance and sing. She was famous for her voice and beauty. One day she went outside the barn for dancing in a birthday party and there after watching the bond of a mother and child, she wished to become a mother.

Plot
Kajal (Savera Nadeem), a famous professional eastern classical singer and dancer was invited in a birthday party to perform. She observed the feeling of a mother for child and wished to become a mother.

Kajal's foster mother (Afshan Qureshi) didn't want her to have baby, but she insisted and in the end the mother made a deal with Sikandar Ali Khan (Ayub Khoso) and decided to sell her Virginity to start prostitution.

Her musician, Wafa (Sohail Asghar), told Kajal about her mother's plan and they both ran away leaving the barn in dark. They shifted to another city, got married and started their new life. After some time they were blessed with a baby girl, whom they named Mahnoor (moon light) as they thought she came into the world to enlighten their life.

Mahnoor (Sara Loren) liked a boy Rohail (Kamran Jillani) who loved her very much and wanted to marry her. But the mother wanted her to study as much as she can. Girl shared her feelings with her father who supported her and convinced his wife.

Mahnoor won first prize in college singing function and approached by music company but her mother didn't give her permission. On Mahnoor's refusal, the owner of music company (Hassan Shaheed Mirza) asked Mahnoor, why her mother didn't like her singing when she herself was very famous for her own singing? Mahnoor who was not aware of her parents' past was little surprised by this news.

The college function story covered by the newspaper and Firdos Bai tracked them through that news. Firdos Bai demanded Kajal to give Mahnoor for prostitution and singing at her business place to compensate the loss she had due to Kajal and Wafa's leaving barn.

Her father shared the whole story of their past with Mahnoor. Kajal was not prepared to let her daughter go to that place which she left once. Rather she preferred to go herself with Firdos Bai. Mahnoor after knowing the truth of her parents, helped them along with her fiancé. They ordered Firdos and her pimp Gullo (Akbar Subhani) to leave the house or they will contact police and saved her mother.

Cast
 Savera Nadeem as Kajal Bai
 Sara Loren as Mahnoor
 Ayub Khoso as Sikandar Ali Khan
 Sohail Asghar as Ustaad Wafa
 Kamran Jillani as Rohail
 Akbar Subhani as Gullo
 Afshan Qureshi as Firdos Bai
 Hassan Shaheed Mirza as Head of music company
 Hareem Qureshi as Birthday girl

Soundtrack

There are four situational songs in this serial. Qawwali and music videos were recorded on original locations. The songs were composed by Javed and Mohsin Allahditta, lyricists was M Nasir and Choreography by Farukh Darbar.

References

External links
 
 Facebook Page
 Producer's website

2000s Urdu-language films
Evergreen Media Europe films
Geo TV original programming
Urdu-language television shows